Meckering is a town  east of Perth, Western Australia along the Great Eastern Highway. Meckering is located within the Shire of Cunderdin.

A railway line was completed in the area in 1895 and Meckering was selected as a station site. The first name chosen for the townsite was Beebering, the Aboriginal name for the hills just north of the town.

The townsite of Beebering was gazetted in 1895. The name of the town was changed to Meckering in 1897 to agree with the station name and the name for the town that was used locally. Meckering is an Aboriginal word thought to mean "moon on the water" or "good hunting".

In early 1898 the population of the town was 225, 150 males and 75 females.

In 1932 the Wheat Pool of Western Australia announced that the town would have two grain elevators, each fitted with an engine, installed at the railway siding.

The surrounding areas produce wheat and other cereal crops. The town is a receival site for Cooperative Bulk Handling.

Earthquake

The town was struck by an earthquake on Monday 14 October 1968.

Total damage amounted to $2.2 million with 20–28 injured.

Transport

Road freight
Meckering is a main stopping point for freight trucks on the way to the eastern states.

Passenger rail service
The MerredinLink service runs between East Perth and Merredin thrice weekly, terminating at Meckering. The Prospector service between East Perth and Kalgoorlie stops at Meckering most days.

See also
 Earthquakes in Western Australia

References

Further reading
Gordon, F.R and J.D. Lewis (1980) The Meckering and Calingiri earthquakes October 1968 and March 1970 Geological Survey of Western Australia Bulletin 126

External links
History of earthquakes in Western Australia
 Shire of Cunderdin – History of Meckering
 Meckering earthquake

Towns in Western Australia
Grain receival points of Western Australia